The Granville Marina is a street in Ramsgate, Kent. It was originally a parade of small shops, tea rooms and houses built in 1877 in the Old English style. The site is reached by Marina Road from Victoria Parade. The Marina formed part of the Granville Hotel, Ramsgate complex planned by Edmund Francis Davis. The buildings also included a large hall on the western end Marina Hall - since demolished. The buildings are partly built into the chalk cliffs below the former hotel.

The Marina was opened by the Mayor of London (Sir Thomas White) on Thursday 5 July 1877. The architect was J T Wimperis and the contractor was Messrs Paramor and Son, of Margate. In the early 1970s the shops were converted into private flats. Numbers 1-4 were Grade II listed on 21 December 2004. Number 1 Granville Marina, formerly a photographic studio (Frederick T Palmer), was demolished in February 2008.

The Graphic wrote of the Marina in 1877:

References

Ramsgate
Buildings and structures completed in 1877
Buildings and structures in Kent
1877 establishments in England